Hill Holliday (HH) is a marketing and communications agency based in Boston, Massachusetts with offices in New York City and  Greenville, South Carolina. It is the 17th largest advertising agency in the U.S. and is part of the world's third-largest advertising and marketing conglomerate, IPG.

Karen Kaplan serves as Chairman and CEO of the agency, having worked there since 1982 when she was hired as a receptionist. She has been named one of the "100 Most Influential Women in Advertising" by Advertising Age.

History 
Hill Holliday was founded in Boston in 1968 as Hill, Holliday, Connors, Cosmopulos, Inc. by partners Jack Connors, Jay Hill, Steve Cosmopulos and Alan Holliday. It was acquired by IPG in 1998.

Awards 
The agency was named Media Magazines full-service Agency of the Year for 2011 and 2012, and is the only agency to win Adweeks Media Plan of the Year four years in a row.

Notable work 
Dunkin Donuts: "America Runs on Dunkin"
Bank of America: "Life's Better When We're Connected"
Cigna: "GO YOU"
 Partnership for Drug-Free Kids: WeGotYou
 AMD K6/K6-2: "Trucks", "Diabolical", and "Flatzone"

References

External links 

Advertising agencies of the United States
Interpublic Group
Companies based in Boston
1968 establishments in Massachusetts
American companies established in 1968
Marketing companies established in 1968
1998 mergers and acquisitions